Las gemelas is a Mexican telenovela produced by Ernesto Alonso for Televisa in 1972.

Cast 
Maricruz Olivier as Paula / Amelia
Guillermo Murray as Carlos
Norma Herrera
Nelly Meden
Sergio Jiménez
Miguel Manzano
Jorge Vargas
Rafael Banquells
Raquel Olmedo
Susana Dosamantes
Martha Zavaleta
Otto Sirgo
Héctor Suárez
Héctor Flores
Enrique Álvarez Félix

References

External links 

Mexican telenovelas
1972 telenovelas
Televisa telenovelas
Spanish-language telenovelas
1972 Mexican television series debuts
1972 Mexican television series endings